Mediahuis is a newspaper & magazine publishing, distribution, printing, TV, radio and online media company founded in 2014 with assets in Belgium, the Netherlands, Ireland, Luxembourg and Germany. Mediahuis publishes daily newspaper titles in Belgium, the Netherlands and Ireland as well as regional titles, and is involved in broadcasting a number of Dutch and French language TV and radio stations.

Irish assets are held in Independent News & Media subsidiary.

The headquarters of Mediahuis is in Antwerp.

History
Mediahuis was founded in January 2014 as a joint venture of two Flemish media corporations Corelio and Concentra. They entered into a collaboration around their paper and digital publishing activities. Corelio took 62% of the shares, Concentra the remaining 38%.

In 2015, Mediahuis acquired the Dutch NRC Media group.
In 2017 it acquired the Dutch Telegraaf Media Groep and VP Exploitatie joined as third shareholder. It took 16.7% of the enlarged group.

In January 2019, Corelio NV, the majority shareholder became Mediahuis Partners NV. Mediahuis Partners NV then held a 50.6% stake in Mediahuis, along with Concentra (32.7%) and VP Exploitatie (16.7%).
These 3 shareholders are in turn mainly owned by the Van Puijenbroek family, Belgian Baert family and Mediahuis chairman Thomas Leysen.

On 30 April 2019 Mediahuis acquired Independent News & Media for 145.6 million euros, which gave Mediahuis control over the Irish Independent and the Sunday Independent (Ireland), respectively Ireland's top-selling daily and Sunday newspaper, among other assets.

In July 2019, Mediahuis were reported to be interested in acquiring JPIMedia.

In September 2020, Mediahuis acquired the heavily loss-making NDC Mediagroep.

Mediahuis Nederland
Mediahuis Nederlands started as the NV Holdingmaatschappij De Telegraaf and was later coined Telegraaf Media Groep N.V. (TMG). In 2017 it was acquired by Mediahuis. It owns De Telegraaf, the most popular newspaper in the Netherlands, DFT, Telesport, Metro, Autovisie, Privé and Vrouw; regional newspapers including Haarlems Dagblad and Noordhollands Dagblad; digital brands including GeenStijl and Dumpert, and the national radio station Classic FM. In addition, Mediahuis Nederland owns dozens of other brands that focus on local news, entertainment and e-commerce. Via Keesing Media Group, the company publishes international puzzle magazines and digital puzzles.

TMG acquired the weblog GeenStijl after initially buying an interest and Hyves, at that time still the most popular social network site in the Netherlands. In 2012, TMG had acquired the free daily newspaper Metro that folded in 2019.

In 2016, TMG held a 23% stake in a joint venture with Talpa Holding, operating radio stations Radio 538, Sky Radio, Radio Veronica, Radio 10 and thematic channels (only on Internet). In addition, the television channel TV 538.

Media Assets

Belgium
 De Standaard
 Het Nieuwsblad
 Gazet van Antwerpen 
 Het Belang van Limburg
 Jobat (jobs website)
 Jet (magazine)
 Gotcha (classified magazine)
 Zimmo (classified magazine)
 Vroom (classified magazine) 
 InMemoriam
 ROB TV, TV Limburg, ATV and TV OOST (Regional TV channels)
 Radio Nostalgie (North and South)
 Metro (stake)
 De Vijver Media (stake)
 Flanders Classics (stake)

Ireland

Irish Independent
Sunday Independent
Sunday World
The Herald
Regional Irish newspapers

Northern Ireland 

 Belfast Telegraph 
 Sunday Life

Germany
 Aachener Zeitung
 Aachener Nachrichten

Netherlands
 De Telegraaf
 NRC Handelsblad
 NDC mediagroep
 Regional Dutch newspapers

See also
Dichtbij.nl
Dumpert

References

External links 
Mediahuis

2013 establishments in Belgium
Mass media companies of Belgium
Dutch-language television networks
Companies based in Antwerp